"What a Fool Believes" is a song written by Michael McDonald and Kenny Loggins. The best-known version was recorded by the Doobie Brothers (with McDonald singing lead vocals) for their 1978 album Minute by Minute. Debuting at number 73 on January 20, 1979, the single reached number one on the Billboard Hot 100 on April 14, 1979, for one week. The song received Grammy Awards in 1980 for both Song of the Year and Record of the Year.

The song was one of the few non-disco No. 1 hits on the Billboard Hot 100 during the first eight months of 1979. The lyrics tell a story of a man who is reunited with an old love interest and attempts to rekindle a romantic relationship with her before discovering that one never really existed.

Composition
Michael McDonald and Kenny Loggins who had wanted to collaborate for some time wrote the song together in Los Angeles. Loggins went to McDonald's house and heard him playing a tune on piano, and suggested they work on that as he already had a hook line, "She had a place in his life" in mind. The song they wrote was influenced by songs they grew up listening to such as the Four Seasons' "Sherry" and "Walk Like a Man". They finished the song by the following day.

Kenny Loggins version

Both Kenny Loggins and Michael McDonald recorded the song around the same time. Loggins' version was a creative arrangement with producer Bob James. Loggins released his version of "What a Fool Believes" five months prior to the Doobie Brothers version on his second album Nightwatch, released on July 12, 1978.

The Doobie Brothers version
The Doobie Brothers with McDonald on vocals recorded a version with producer Ted Templeman. They recorded numerous takes of its rhythm track over five or six days, but had problem finding a version that they liked, and Templeman ended up playing drums with Keith Knudsen to try to achieve a "floppy feel" with the song. Templeman eventually decided, to the band's horror, to cut up the master tape of a recording into sections, and put together a usable version. McDonald came up with the rest of the arrangement, adding the keyboard, vocals and strings to the song. The resulting song was stylistically unlike any song the Doobie Brothers had done before. Templeman was still not satisfied with the result; when he played the song to the executives of Warner Bros., he suggested discarding the song, but they said: "Are you crazy? That's great!"

In December 1978, five months after Loggins' original recording was released, the Doobie Brothers included their version on their album Minute by Minute, with their version being released as a single the following month. This is the best-known version of the song, debuting at number 73 on the Billboard Hot 100 on January 20, 1979, and then reaching number one on April 14, 1979, for one week.

This version received Grammy Awards in 1980 for both Song of the Year and Record of the Year.

Apparently as a joke, Michael Jackson claimed in a videotaped phone conversation with Elizabeth Taylor in 2003 that he contributed at least one backing track to the original Doobie Brothers recording, but was not credited for having done so. Entertainment Tonight broadcast this claim with viewers being unaware that Jackson was joking. The band later denied his participation.

Reception
Billboard praised the vocal performance, synthesizers and production. The reviewer described the song as building from a melodic first verse "to a heart warming hook chorus".  Cash Box said it has an "easy funk backing, strings overhead and characteristically unique vocals which soar upwards." Record World said that in the song the Doobie Brothers go to "an easy going beat with distinctive lead and high harmony hook."

Ultimate Classic Rock critic Michael Gallucci rated "What a Fool Believes" as the Doobie Brothers all-time greatest song, particularly praising "McDonald's soulful vocals and soft and warm keyboard riffs." In 2021, it was listed at No. 343 on Rolling Stone's "Top 500 Greatest Songs of All Time".

Personnel
Patrick Simmons – guitar, backing vocals
Jeff "Skunk" Baxter – guitar
Michael McDonald – piano, synthesizers, lead and backing vocals
Tiran Porter – bass guitar, backing vocals
Keith Knudsen – drums, backing vocals

Additional players
 Ted Templeman – drums
Bill Payne – synthesizer (with Michael McDonald)
Bobby LaKind – congas, backing vocals

Charts

Weekly charts

Year-end charts

Certifications

Other versions by Loggins and McDonald
A live version appears on Loggins' 1980 album Kenny Loggins Alive. Loggins' original version switches several of the gender pronouns, so that it is sung largely from the perspective of the woman in the encounter.

A reissue of the single was released in 1987 credited to the Doobie Brothers featuring Michael McDonald. It was included on McDonald's 1986 compilation album Sweet Freedom and was credited here as Michael McDonald with the Doobie Brothers. It reached No. 57 on the UK Singles Chart in January 1987.

There is a Loggins/McDonald live duet on Loggins' 1993 album Outside: From the Redwoods.

Warner Brothers also released a 12-inch single disco version by the Doobie Brothers in 1978 (backed with "Don't Stop to Watch the Wheels"), which peaked at number 40 on Billboards Disco Action Chart in April 1979. Mixed by disco producer Jim Burgess, at 5:31 the song is considerably longer than the 3:41 versions on the 7-inch single and the Minute by Minute LP. The 12-inch version also has a more pronounced bass-driven drumbeat.<ref>{{cite web|url=http://www.discomusic.com/records-more/257_0_2_0_C/|title=What A Fool Believes (12")|website=Discomusic.com|quotation=They comment: Disco from an unlikely artist ... "What A Fool Believes" was remixed by the late Jim Burgess to enhance its dance floor appeal. Another good Doobie Brothers 12 inch release was "Real Love"}}</ref>

Matt Bianco version

British band Matt Bianco released their version of "What a Fool Believes" as a single in 1991. It is from their fourth album Samba in Your Casa. The single reached No. 23 on the Irish Singles Chart in early 1992.

Track listing
A. "What a Fool Believes" (mixed by Bobby Summerfield)
B1. "Samba in Your Casa" (Cashassa Mix) (mixed by Bobby Summerfield)
B2. "Say It's Not Too Late"

Other cover versions
Numerous cover versions of the song have been recorded, including:
1980: Aretha Franklin – from the album Aretha, No. 46 in the UK
1991: George Michael – from Live in Birmingham, a 1991 live bootleg
1997: The Wades – from The Feel Good Factor1998: Peter Cox – a top 40 hit in the UK, from the 1998 reissue of his self-titled debut solo album
1998: M People – from The Best of M People and Testify
2000: Self – from Gizmodgery2013: Unchain – from Love & Groove Delivery2014: The Doobie Brothers featuring Sara Evans – from their studio album Southbound''

References

Further reading

1978 songs
1979 singles
The Doobie Brothers songs
Kenny Loggins songs
Billboard Hot 100 number-one singles
Cashbox number-one singles
Grammy Award for Record of the Year
Grammy Award for Song of the Year
Songs written by Kenny Loggins
Songs written by Michael McDonald (musician)
1991 singles
Matt Bianco songs
Warner Records singles
East West Records singles
Grammy Award for Best Instrumental Arrangement Accompanying Vocalist(s)
Song recordings produced by Ted Templeman
RPM Top Singles number-one singles